Abramów may refer to the following places in Lublin Voivodeship, Poland:
Abramów, Biłgoraj County
Abramów, Lubartów County